The Saemoonan Church is a church in Jongno-gu, South Korea. It was founded in September 1887 by Horace Grant Underwood. This makes the church, with a 132-year history, the oldest established church in South Korea.

History 
The Saemoonan Church was founded in September 1887 when Horace Grant Underwood baptized one person and appointed two elders in an organization of fourteen Koreans. Over the years, it has gone through 6 different chapels, constructing the latest chapel from 2014 to 2019. The design of the chapel attracted attention from media due to its unconventional design like a mother's arms spread wide, and with much community space.

The current senior pastor is Lee Sang-hak, who took over in 2017. He was previously senior pastor at Pohang Cheil Church.

References 

Presbyterian churches in Seoul
Buildings and structures in Jongno District
1880s establishments in Korea